The following is a list of notable deaths in April 1966.

Entries for each day are listed alphabetically by surname. A typical entry lists information in the following sequence:
 Name, age, country of citizenship at birth, subsequent country of citizenship (if applicable), reason for notability, cause of death (if known), and reference.

April 1966

1 
 Karl Adam, German Catholic theologian (b. 1876)
 Arnold Franz Brasz, American artist (b. 1888)
 Sollie Cohen, American football player (b. 1907)
 Dimitar Dimov, Bulgarian writer (b. 1909)
 James G. Ellis, American musician and composer (b. 1880)
 Sister Ignatia, Irish-American nun noted for working with alcoholics (b. 1889)
 Flann O'Brien, Irish humorist (b. 1911)

2 
 Charles Brown, New Zealand rugby player (b. 1887)
 C. S. Forester, English author (b. 1899)
 Sverre Hope, Norwegian politician, MP (b. 1902)
 William King, Australian politician, member of the Queensland Legislative Assembly (b. 1893)
 Vladimir L'vovich Korvin-Piotrovskii, Russian poet and exile (b. 1891)

3 
 Russel Crouse, American playwright and librettist (b. 1893)
 Rocco DiSiglio, American boxer and mobster (b. 1939)
 Battista Farina, Italian car designer (b. 1893)
 Stella Weiner Kriegshaber, American pianist (b. 1879)

4 
 Bernard Adeney, English painter and textile designer (b. 1878)
 Georges de Crequi-Montfort, French sport shooter, competed in 1912 Olympics and 1924 Olympics (b. 1877)
 Jimmy Daywalt, American race car driver (b. 1924)
 Maurie De Araugo, Australian rules footballer (b. 1902)
 Karl Krook, Swedish tug-of-war competitor, competed at the 1908 Summer Olympics (b. 1887)
 Edmond Locard, French criminologist (b. 1877)

5 
 Clarence Owen Cooper, Canadian politician, member of the Canadian House of Commons (b. 1899)
 Harold Costley-White, English Anglican priest (b. 1878)
 Sam Dodge, American baseball player (b. 1889)
 Ragnar Ekberg, Swedish athlete, competed in the 1908 and 1912 Summer Olympics (b. 1886)
 Slats Gill, American basketball coach (b. 1901)
 Caleb V. Haynes, American Air Force general (b. 1895)
 Tadeusz Kuchar, Polish footballer (b. 1891)

6 
 Père Azaïs, French missionary and archeologist (b. 1870)
 Emil Brunner, Swiss Reformed theologian (b. 1889)
 Harold Cotton, Australian cricketer (b. 1914)
 Hans Engen, Norwegian diplomat (b. 1912)
 Julia Faye, American actress (b. 1893)
 Edna Flugrath, American actress (b. 1893) 
 Norman Hobbs, English cricketer (b. 1900)

7 
 Fred G. Aandahl, American politician, governor of North Dakota (1945–1951), member of U.S. House of Representative (1951–1953) (b. 1897)
 Harry Cator, English recipient of the Victoria Cross (b. 1894)
 George Cornelius, Australian rules footballer (b. 1874)
 Basil Davenport, American writer (b. 1905)
 Bert Dingley, American race car driver (b. 1885)
 Walt Hansgen, American race car driver (b. 1919)
 Ebenezer Kendell, Australian politician, member of the New South Wales Legislative Assembly (b. 1886)

8 
 John W. Gates, American politician, member of New York State Assembly and New York State Senate (b. 1872) 
 Felicjan Kępiński, Polish astronomer (b. 1885)
 Elizabeth O. King, American biologist (b. 1912)
 Carl Schurz Vrooman, Assistant United States Secretary of Agriculture (b. 1872)

9 
 Ralph M. Brown, American politician and judge, speaker of the California State Assembly (b. 1908)
 Barry Butler, English footballer (b. 1934)
 Ray Krouse, American football player (b. 1927)

10 
 Heinz Barwich, German nuclear physicist, worked on the Soviet atom bomb program (b. 1911)
 Kawabata Ryūshi, Japanese painter (b. 1885)
 Clara Landsberg, American educator (b. 1873)
 Karl Magnussen, Danish cyclist, competed at the 1936 Summer Olympics (b. 1915)
 Evelyn Waugh, English author (b. 1903)

11 
 A. B. Campbell, British naval officer and radio personality (b. 1881)
 Roman Dzeneladze, Soviet wrestler, competed in the 1956 Summer Olympics (b. 1933)
 Asmund Enger, Norwegian sports shooter, competed in the 1908 Summer Olympics (b. 1881)
 Rufus Fitzgerald, American academic administrator, Chancellor of the University of Pittsburgh (b. 1890)
 Paul Haugh, American politician, member of the Wisconsin State Assembly (b. 1896)
 Ya'akov Klivnov, Russian-born Israeli politician, member of the Knesset (b. 1887)
 Avtandil Koridze, Georgian-Soviet Greco-Roman wrestler, gold medal in the 1960 Summer Olympics (b. 1935)

12 
 Milislav Demerec, Austria-Hungary-born American scientist (b. 1895) 
 Sir Waithilingam Duraiswamy, Ceylonese politician, speaker of the State Council of Ceylon (b. 1874)
 Joe Harris, American baseball player (b. 1882)
 Janez Jalen, Yugoslav writer and priest (b. 1891)
 Evgeny Maleev, Soviet paleontologist (b. 1915)

13 
 Abdul Salam Arif, Iraqi military office and statesman, President of the Republic (b. 1921)
 Bert Avery, New Zealand rugby league player (b. 1895)
 Clellan Card, American radio personality (b. 1903)
 Carlo Carrà, Italian painter (b. 1881)
Georges Duhamel, French author (b. 1884).
 Lionel Edwards, British artist (b. 1878) 
 Billy Fitchford, English footballer and cricketer (b. 1892)
 William S. Flynn, American politician, Governor of Rhode Island (b. 1885)
 Gussie Gannon, American baseball player (b. 1873)
 Charles Heslop, British actor (b. 1883)
 Felix von Luckner, German naval commander during World War I (b. 1881)

14 
 John L. Barkley, United States Army Medal of Honor recipient of World War I (b. 1895)
 Theodore William Chaundy, English mathematician (b. 1889)
 George A. Lundberg, American sociologist (b. 1895)

15 
 Habibullah Bahar Chowdhury, Pakistani writer and politician, Health Minister of East Pakistan (b. 1906)
 Joseph Crehan, American actor (b. 1883)
 Lloyd Garrett, American vaudeville performer and composer (b. 1886)
 William C. Giese, American educator and politician, member of the Wisconsin State Assembly (b. 1886)
 Robert Leslie Harrison, Australian politician, member of the Queensland Legislative Assembly (b. 1903)
 Fritz Jenssen, Norwegian politician, mayor of Oslo during Nazi occupation, convicted of treason (b. 1886)
 Elfric Wells Chalmers Kearney, Australian engineer and inventor (b. 1881)
 Rina De Liguoro, Italian actress (b. 1892)

16 
 Nandalal Bose, Indian painter (b. 1882)
 Otto Buchinger, German physician (b. 1878)
 Stafford Cassell, American football coach (b. 1909)
 Sir Ernest Gowers, British writer (b. 1880)
 Willie Haupt, American race car driver (b. 1885)
 Sekō Higa, Okinawan martial arts teacher (b. 1898)
 Herschel Johnson, American diplomat, Ambassador to Sweden, the United Nations, and Brazil (b. 1894)
 Eric Lambert, English-born Australian politician (b. 1918)
 Roger Lapham, American politician, Mayor of San Francisco (b. 1883)
 Gaspar Lefebvre, French religious (b. 1880)

17 
 Christiane Delyne, American-born French actress (b. 1902)
 Petre V. Haneș, Romanian literary historian (b. 1879)
 John Jewell, English-born South African cricketer (b. 1891)

18 
 Ernest Bacon, British wrestler, competed in the 1924 Summer Olympics (b. 1893)
 Maginel Wright Enright, American children's book illustrator (b. 1881)
 Edward Fitzgerald, American ice hockey player, competed in the 1920 Summer Olympics (b. 1891)
 Joseph E. Maddy, American music educator (b. 1891)

19 
 Gösta Åsbrink, Swedish gymnast and modern pentathlete; Olympic athlete: gold medal in the 1908 Summer Olympics, silver medal in the 1912 Summer Olympics (b. 1881)
 Jack Cock, English footballer (b. 1893) 
 Brigadier Sir Neil Hamilton Fairley, Australian physician and army officer (b. 1891)
 E. Snapper Ingram, American politician (b. 1884)
 Maury Kent, American basketball, baseball, and football coach (b. 1885)
 Javier Solís, Mexican singer (b. 1931)

20 
 Rufus Cole, American doctor (b. 1872)
 Earle Cook, Canadian politician, member of the Legislative Assembly of Alberta (b. 1881)
 Prince Frederick of Prussia, German-born British aristocrat, Grandson of the last Kaiser (b. 1911)
 Johnny Johnson, British philatelist (b. 1884)
 Jens Kirkegaard, Danish gymnast, silver medalist at the 1912 Summer Olympics (b. 1889)

21 
 Sepp Dietrich, Nazi German military leader (b. 1892)
 Tray Grinter, English cricketer (b. 1885)
 Archibald Montgomerie, 17th Earl of Eglinton, Scottish nobleman (b. 1914)

22 
 Aslaug Blytt, Norwegian art historian, museum manager, politician (b. 1899)
 Lou Finney, American baseball player (b. 1910)
 Enrico Glori, Italian actor (b. 1901)
 Rienk Kuiper, Dutch-born American theologian and academic (b. 1886)

23 
 Naima Akef, Egyptian belly-dancer and actress (b. 1929)
 Heinrich Dollwetzel, East German Major General (b. 1912)
 George Ohsawa, Japanese diet founder (b. 1893)

24 
 Melecio Arranz, Filipino politician; member of the Senate (b. 1888)
 Simon Chikovani, Georgian poet and Soviet politician, deputy to the Supreme Soviet (b. 1902)
 J. Morris Foster, American actor (b. 1881)
 Harry R. Jefferson, American football and basketball coach (b. c. 1896)
 Joasaph Leliukhin, Ukrainian cleric, Bishop of the Russian Orthodox Church, Metropolitan of Kiev and Galicia and Exarch of Ukraine (b. 1903)
 Louis A. Johnson, American politician, US Secretary of Defense (b. 1891)

25 
 Art Decatur, American baseball player (b. 1894)
 Iorrie Isaacs, Welsh rugby player (b. 1911)
 Maria Nikolaevna Kuznetsova, Russian opera singer (b. 1880)

26 
 Earnest Sevier Cox, American Methodist preacher and political activist (b. 1880)
 Bill Everson, Welsh rugby player (b. 1906)
 Roberto Faz, Cuban singer (b. 1914)
 Tom Florie, American soccer player (b. 1897)
 Samuel Kahanamoku, American swimmer, medalist at the 1924 Summer Olympics (b. 1902)

27 
 Kenzō Futaki, Japanese doctor (b. 1873) 
 Walter P. Kuptz, American politician, member of the Wisconsin State Assembly (b. 1898)

28 
 Joseph Birds, English footballer (b. 1887)
 Gilberto Govi, Italian actor (b. 1885)

29 
 Rolf Bergersen, Norwegian sport shooter, world champion and Olympic competitor (b. 1906)
 Earle D. Chesney, American cartoonist (b. 1900)
 William Eccles, British physicist and radio pioneer (b. 1875)
 Catherine Fonteney, French actress (b. 1879)
 Hugo Friend, Austro-Hungarian-born American jurist (b. 1882)
 Tom Hales, Irish republican and politician, TD (b. 1892)
 Sílvio Lagreca, Brazilian football manager (b. 1895)
 Terence MacDermot, Jamaican-born Canadian diplomat, High Commissioner to Australia and South Africa, Ambassador to Israel and Greece (b. 1896)
 Eugene O'Brien, American actor (b. 1880)

30 
 Everett Case, American basketball coach (b. 1900)
 Richard Fariña, American writer and folksinger (b. 1937)
 Jan Cornelis Hofman, Dutch painter (b. 1889)
 Shunsuke Kondo, Japanese politician (b. 1890)
 Ernst Heinrich Landrock, German photographer (b. 1878)
 Nicolae Gh. Lupu, Romanian physician (b. 1884)
 Duane Lyman, American architect (b. 1886)

References

1966-04
April 1966 events